Glutathione S-transferase A1 is an enzyme that in humans is encoded by the GSTA1 gene.

Cytosolic and membrane-bound forms of glutathione S-transferase are encoded by two distinct supergene families. These enzymes function in the detoxification of electrophilic compounds, including carcinogens, therapeutic drugs, environmental toxins and products of oxidative stress, by conjugation with glutathione. The genes encoding these enzymes are known to be highly polymorphic. These genetic variations can change an individual's susceptibility to carcinogens and toxins as well as affect the toxicity and efficacy of some drugs. At present, eight distinct classes of the soluble cytoplasmic mammalian glutathione S-transferases have been identified: alpha, kappa, mu, omega, pi, sigma, theta and zeta. This gene encodes a glutathione S-transferase belonging to the alpha class. The alpha class genes, located in a cluster mapped to chromosome 6, are the most abundantly expressed glutathione S-transferases in liver (hepatocytes) and kidney (proximal tubules). In addition to metabolizing bilirubin and certain anti-cancer drugs in the liver, the alpha class of these enzymes exhibit glutathione peroxidase activity, thereby protecting the cells from reactive oxygen species and the products of peroxidation.

Release of GST-A1 as an indication of cellular necrosis

Increases in serum and urinary GST-A1 have been found in association with hepatocyte and renal proximal tubular necrosis respectively, and have potential for monitoring injury to these tissues.

References

Further reading